Manoj Gajurel is a Nepali comedian, actor, singer, model, and judge of a stand-up reality show called Comedy Champion.

Childhood 
Born on 12 May 1974, Manoj Gajurel was raised by his mother Indramaya Gajurel and brother Keshav Gajurel after the demise of his father Bhawani Prasad Gajurel just after 4 months of his birth. He changed 11 schools until he passed School Leaving Certificate.

Career 
He started his career early as soon as he completed the master's degree in Mass communication from Tribhuwan University. He performed acts and released audio cassettes like Photocopy, HAHAHA, ManojRanjan, etc. which are the popular releases from him.

He also started performing mimicry of popular political leaders like Puspa Kamal Dahal "Prachanda", Gyanendra Shah, Narendra Modi, Donald Trump etc. After his regular presentations through audios and radio programs, he has offered so many stage programs. He has visited almost all districts Of Nepal and many countries s to attend stage programs.

Filmography

Television

Gallery
Manoj Gajure's various characters

References

External links
 

Living people
Nepalese male models
20th-century Nepalese male actors
21st-century Nepalese male actors
Nepalese male television actors
Nepalese male stage actors
1974 births
People from Taplejung District
Nepalese male comedians